was a Japanese graphic artist and fashion designer born in Higashikagawa, Kagawa Prefecture. He became famous as an illustrator in the 1920s when his work appeared in the magazine Shojo No Tomo. According to the scholar Nozomi Masuda, Nakahara "greatly developed the eyes of shojo manga characters".

See also 
Shōjo manga
Yumeji Takehisa
Katsuji Matsumoto

References

External links 
Official website
中原淳一公式Facebook
中原淳一公式twitter
中原淳一公式instagram
歴史秘話ヒストリア 第101回 “カワイイ”に恋して 

1913 births
1983 deaths
Japanese graphic designers
Artists from Kagawa Prefecture
20th-century Japanese artists
Japanese fashion designers